333 Stroud Road is a former farmhouse on Stroud Road, Tuffley, Gloucester. It became a Grade II listed building on 12 March 1973.

History
It was built as a farmhouse in the early 17th century.

During the 20th century, it was left abandoned for years. In November 2008, the buildings badly dilapidated state was discussed in a building environment meeting. It was agreed that this needed further investigation.

Architecture
The building is early 17th century with later alterations and was converted in the 18th and early 19th century to several cottages. From the early 20th century it was converted into a house and was later restored as  a single dwelling within the same century. It has a Timber frame with rendered nogging on squared, coursed stone rubble and later brick dwarf walls. It has a stone slate gabled roof with gabled dormers, brick stacks. A long, single-depth range with a later half-gabled cross wing with a flanking lean-to addition at the south end.

Inside it consists of a single storey with an attic. There is square panel framing to all external walls. At the front there is a central entrance doorway, and a doorway in the cross-gable addition. Both doorways have shallow hoods above on timber brackets. In the cross gable to the left is a slightly projecting, canted oriel window with casements to front and sides with sill supported on a shaped bracket. Above the oriel window across the centre of the gable is a hood shaped covering made of stone slates. Set in the gabled dormer to the right on the first floor are leadlight casement windows surrounded by 19th century wood.

References

Buildings and structures in Gloucester
Houses completed in the 17th century
Grade II listed houses in Gloucestershire